Chris Johnson (born 1978) is an American politician serving in the Mississippi State Senate from the 45th district since 2020. He served in the Mississippi House of Representatives from the 87th district from 2016 to 2020.

Early life and education 
Johnson attended Forrest County Agricultural High School located in the outskirts of Hattiesburg, Mississippi. He attended Pearl River Community College and graduated from the University of Southern Mississippi with a Bachelor of Science in Accounting in 2001.

Career 
Johnson is an owner of multiple businesses, including a financial services firm operating in four states.

In 2015, he ran as a Republican for election to the Mississippi House of Representatives for the 87th district, which covers Forrest and Lamar counties, to fill the seat of retiring Democrat Johnny Stringer. He got 49.2% of the vote in the Republican primary and 80.2% of the vote in the general election; he assumed office on January 5, 2016. In the house, he was vice-chairman for the Public Health and Human Services committee and was a member on the following others: Agriculture; Corrections; Education; Banking and Financial Services; Transportation; and Performance Based Budgeting.

In 2019, incumbent, and friend of Johnson, Billy Hudson of the 45th district announced his retirement from the Mississippi State Senate, prompting Johnson to run for election to the seat within one day. He responded to claims of dismay from Republican leadership in the House as "rumors." He ran uncontested in the Republican primary and general election, securing 100% of the vote in both; he assumed office on January 7, 2020. In the Senate, he chairs the Constitution committee and is vice-chair for the Medicaid committee. He is a member on the following others: Appropriations; Business and Financial Institutions; Drug Policy; Education; Insurance; Public, Health, and Welfare; and Tourism.

Personal life 
Johnson is married to Wendi Burton and has two children.

References 

Republican Party Mississippi state senators
Living people
21st-century American politicians
Pearl River Community College alumni
University of Southern Mississippi alumni
Republican Party members of the Mississippi House of Representatives
1978 births